Cowboys and Aliens is the fourth studio album by British alternative rock band Kitchens of Distinction, released on 3 October 1994 in the UK by One Little Indian Records and on 24 January 1995 by A&M Records in the US.

The album was recorded in Kippford, Scotland at Pete Bartlett's Radio King studio through the summer and autumn of 1993. One Little Indian rejected the album twice, and eventually, both label and band agreed to bring in up-and-coming producer Pascal Gabriel to work on a couple of tracks. One of the label's complaints about the album as the band originally submitted it was that they felt it lacked a potential hit single, so Gabriel produced a new song ("Come on Now") that the band had written after the rest of the album had already been recorded; Gabriel also remixed two of the album's other tracks (the opener "Sand on Fire" and first single "Now It's Time to Say Goodbye," which peaked at number 86 on the UK Singles Chart). Although the band admitted that they enjoyed working with Gabriel, the changes did nothing to help the album's dismal sales. By the end of 1995, both A&M and OLI had dropped the band.

Following the album's release, the band shortened their name to Kitchens O.D. and recorded and released the non-album single "Feel My Genie"/"To Love a Star" in May 1996 before disbanding.

Track listing

Singles 
 "Now It's Time to Say Goodbye" (September 1994)
 "Now It's Time to Say Goodbye"
 "Jesus Nevada"
 "White Horses"
 "What We Really Wanted to Do"

Personnel 
Kitchens of Distinction 
 Patrick Fitzgerald – vocals, bass
 Julian Swales – guitar
 Dan Goodwin – drums, percussion
Technical
 Producers: Kitchens of Distinction and Pete Bartlett, except:
 "Come on Now" produced by Pascal Gabriel
 "Sand on Fire" and "Now It's Time to Say Goodbye" remixed by Pascal Gabriel
 Katie Meehan – vocals on "Sand on Fire", "Get Over Yourself", "Remember Me?" and "Now It's Time to Say Goodbye"
 Harvey Brough – string arrangements on "Come on Now"
 Richard Lohr – photography
 Design by Cactus
 Recorded and mixed at Kippford, Scotland
 Studio conceived and installed by Pete Bartlett
 Vibes by Kristine Filer
 Mastered at Metropolis by Tim Young

References

External links 
 [ Allmusic's review of "Now It's Time to Say Goodbye" single]

Kitchens of Distinction albums
1994 albums
Albums produced by Pete Bartlett
Albums produced by Pascal Gabriel
One Little Independent Records albums